Dan Namingha (born 1950, Keams Canyon, Arizona) is a Hopi painter and sculptor. He is Dextra Quotskuyva's son, and a great-great-grandson of Nampeyo. He is a member of the Hopi-Tewa member of the Hopi Tribe. He lives in Santa Fe, New Mexico.

Early life and education
Namingha grew up with his mother on his grandparents’ ranch in Polacca on the Hopi Reservation. As a child he would draw with coal while using grocery boxes as a canvas. In elementary school, Namingha would arriver early to create in a makeshift studio a teacher had created after noticing a lot of the Hopi and Tewa children had an interest in art. In high school, Namingha attended a University of Kansas summer art program. He also studied at the Institute of American Indian Arts and the School of the Art Institute of Chicago.

Style
Dan Namingha has been showing professionally as an artist for 40 years. His heritage inspires his work, which explores connections between physical and the spirit world and includes of Hopi symbolism.

Drawing and painting was a natural part of Hopi childhood. It gave him a way to express his strong feelings about the culture and environment leading to a path of creative freedom. Dan feels that change and evolution are a continuum; socially, politically, spiritually and that the future of our planet and membership of the human race must be monitored to insure survival in the spirit of cultural and technology diversity. He says that only then can we merge the positive and negative polarization and balance so necessary to communal spirit of the universe.

Dan Namingha's artworks are in the collections of the Fogg Art Museum of Harvard University, the Smithsonian Institution, the Sundance Institute, the Wheelwright Museum, the New Mexico Museum of Art, the Heard Museum, and numerous foreign museums, including the British Royal Collection in London.

Recognition
In 2009, the Institute of American Indian Arts awarded him an honorary doctorate and in 2016, the Museum of Indian Arts and Culture named Namingha its 2016 "Living Treasure."

Namingha's work was part of Stretching the Canvas: Eight Decades of Native Painting (2019–21), a survey at the National Museum of the American Indian George Gustav Heye Center in New York.

Family
His son Arlo Namingha is also a well-known sculptor, and his younger son Michael Namingha works in digital art. All three artists exhibit at the Namingha's Santa Fe gallery, Niman Fine Art.

Education
University of Kansas, Lawrence, Kansas
Institute of American Indian Arts, Santa Fe, New Mexico
Art Institute of Chicago, Chicago, Illinois

Publications
The Art of Dan Namingha by Thomas Hoving, Abrams Publishing, New York

References

External links
Niman Gallery Santa Fe - Artist's online portfolio and biography
Ann Korologos Gallery - Paintings by Dan Namingha, biography, press, and video.

1950 births
Living people
Artists from Santa Fe, New Mexico
Hopi people
Institute of American Indian Arts alumni
Native American painters
Native American sculptors
Painters from New Mexico
Pueblo artists
Sculptors from New Mexico
20th-century Native Americans
21st-century Native Americans